Jose Abad Santos may refer to:

 José Abad Santos, a Chief Justice of the Supreme Court of the Philippines and national hero, source of the other names on this page
 Jose Abad Santos, Davao Occidental, a municipality in the Philippines
 Jose Abad Santos Memorial School, Manila campus of the primary and secondary education division of the Philippine Women's University
 Jose Abad Santos Memorial School Quezon City campus
 Jose Abad Santos Avenue, a highway spanning four provinces in Central Luzon, Philippines
 Abad Santos Avenue, a major thoroughfare in Manila, Philippines
 Abad Santos station, a station of Manila LRT
 Arellano University - Jose Abad Santos Campus, located in Pasay, Philippines